Petrograd is the former name of the second city of Russia, now known as Saint Petersburg.

Petrograd may also refer to:

Places
 Central Petrograd, Petrograd, Russia; the city centre
 Petrograd Island, Petrograd, Russia; the origin of the old city of Petrograd
 , Petrograd, Russia; the portion of Petrograd lying on islands in the Nena Delta; see Geography of Saint Petersburg
 Petrograd Metropolis electoral district (Russian Constituent Assembly election, 1917)
 Petrograd Military District, Empire of Russia
 Petrograd Governorate, Tsardom of Russia

Military
 Battle of Petrograd (1919), Russian Civil War
 Siege of Petrograd (1940s), WWII
 2nd Petrograd Infantry Division

Other uses
 University of Petrograd, Petrograd, Russia

See also

 Petrograd formula
 Petrograd Standard
 New Petrograd, New Jersey, USA
 
 Petrovgrad
 Leningrad (disambiguation)
 Petersburg (disambiguation)
 Saint Petersburg (disambiguation)

ru:Петроград (значения)